Oy Vey! My Son Is Gay!! is a 2009 comedy film directed, co-written, and produced by Evgeny Afineevsky and starring Lainie Kazan, Saul Rubinek, Vincent Pastore, John Lloyd Young, Jai Rodriguez, Bruce Vilanch, Fred Swink and Carmen Electra. The theme song, "The Word Is Love" was written by Desmond Child and performed by Lulu. "The Word is Love" was contending for nominations in the Original Song category for the 82nd Academy Awards.

The film concerns an interfaith relationship. An adult Jewish man comes out to his parents as gay. They try to come to terms to it, but are displeased that their son's boyfriend is not Jewish.

Plot
Twenty-five year old real estate agent Nelson Hirsch is having problems telling his overbearing Jewish parents—Martin and Shirley Hirsch—that he is gay, let alone in a loving relationship, not only with a man, Angelo Ferraro, but a non-Jewish one. However, he and Angelo have made a time sensitive pact to tell their respective parents about their relationship. It becomes even more complicated as, out of circumstance, Nelson discovers that his mother—and thus by association his father—believe the new significant other in his life is not Angelo, who they assume is solely his decorator, but rather Nelson and Angelo's neighbor, Playpen Playmate of the month, Sybil Williams. That complication is exacerbated by the fact that his mom will only hear and see what she wants to, which in this situation is coming to terms with Nelson being in love with a shiksa who takes her clothes off in public.

When Nelson is finally able to tell his parents the truth, Martin and Shirley (who have their own slightly different preconceived notions about homosexuality), have to find a way to come to terms with it. The couple are concerned about how their friends and relatives will react; they are especially concerned about Martin's macho employer, his Uncle Moisha, and Shirley's brother and sister-in-law, Max and Sophie.

Equally as difficult is relating to Angelo's Italian parents, Carmine and Terry Ferraro, who have their own issues in dealing with Angelo and Nelson's relationship. Nelson and Angelo's time-sensitive issue advances their relationship to the next level, with the potential to turn the world of this collective group further on its head.

Awards
 Official Selection 26th annual Boston LGBT Film Fest 2010
 Charlotte Gay & Lesbian Film Festival 2010
 Festival Special Award
 Official Selection Filmfest Hamburg 2010
 FilmOut 2010
 Best Actress in a Feature Film – Lainie Kazan
 Best Direction – Evgeny Afineevsky
 Best Narrative Feature - Evgeny Afineevsky / Svetlana Anufrieva
 Best Actor in a Supporting Role – Saul Rubinek
 Freedom Award – Ensemble Cast in a Feature Film
 Fire Island Pines International Film Festival 2009
 Spotlight Award - Evgeny Afineevsky
 Fort Worth Gay and Lesbian International Film Festival 2010
 Rising Star Award – Evgeny Afineevsky
 13 Annual Jewish Film Festival In Miami 2010
 Audience Award for Best Feature Film
 LesGaiCineMad – Madrid International LGTB Film Festival 2010
 Special PUBLICO Award LesGaiCineFamilia (Special Audience Award LesGaiCineFamilia)
 24th Festival Mix Milano 2010
 Premio speciale del pubblico (The Audience Award)
 Monaco Charity Film Festival 2008
 Award for Best Original Comedy Screenplay - Evgeny Afineevsky
 Official Selection Montreal World Film Festival 2009
 Official Selection 32 Moscow International Film Festival
 New York International Independent Film & Video Festival 2009
 Best Ensemble Cast in a Feature Film Award
 Audience Award for Best Feature Film
 6th Philadelphia QFEST 2010
 Audience Award winner - Best Comedic Feature
 Official Selection 28th Reeling Chicago Film Festival 2009
 Official Selection Rochester ImageOut 2010
 Tampa International Gay and Lesbian Film Festival 2010
 Outreach Award – Evgeny Afineevsky
 Official Selection 19th Tokyo International Lesbian & Gay Film Festival 2010
 25th Turin LGBT Film Festival 2010
 Audience Award for Best Comedy Feature Film
 WorldFest-Houston International Film Festival 2008 & 2010
 Best Comedy - Adaptation or Original Screenplay - Evgeny Afineevsky
 First Directors Crystal Vision Special Jury Award - Evgeny Afineevsky
 Silver Remi Award - Evgeny Afineevsky
 Special Jury Rising Star Award - Evgeny Afineevsky

References

External links
 
 
 
 

2009 films
2009 comedy films
2009 LGBT-related films
American LGBT-related films
Films directed by Evgeny Afineevsky
LGBT-related comedy films
Films about Jews and Judaism
Gay-related films
American interfaith romance films
Films about Italian-American culture
Films with screenplays by Menahem Golan
2000s English-language films
2000s American films